Joshua Ryan Wells (born February 14, 1991) is an American football offensive tackle for the Tampa Bay Buccaneers of the National Football League (NFL). He was signed as an undrafted free agent by the Jacksonville Jaguars after the 2014 NFL Draft. He played college football at James Madison.

Professional career

Jacksonville Jaguars
Following the 2014 NFL Draft, Wells was signed by the Jacksonville Jaguars as an undrafted free agent. He made the team's 53-man roster on August 30, 2014.

On September 4, 2016, Wells was placed on injured reserve with a thumb injury. He was activated off injured reserve to the active roster on November 21, 2016.

On February 17, 2017, Wells re-signed with the Jaguars. He played in 15 games in 2017, starting four at right and left tackle due to injuries.

In 2018, Wells was named the backup left tackle to start the season behind Cam Robinson. He was later named the starter in Week 3 after Robinson suffered a season-ending torn ACL. He started the next three games before suffering a groin injury in Week 5. He was placed on injured reserve on October 12, 2018. He was activated off injured reserve on December 14, 2018. He was placed back on injured reserve on December 28, 2018, with a concussion.

On April 2, 2019, Wells re-signed with the Jaguars. He was released during final roster cuts on August 30, 2019.

Tampa Bay Buccaneers
On September 10, 2019, Wells was signed by the Tampa Bay Buccaneers. Wells played in 13 games, of which he started two, in the 2019 season.

He was re-signed on May 5, 2020. Wells played in all four games in the Buccaneers' playoff run that resulted in the team winning Super Bowl LV.

Wells re-signed with the Buccaneers again on March 30, 2021. He played in all 17 games as the primary swing tackle.

On March 28, 2022, Wells re-signed with the Buccaneers. He suffered a calf injury in Week 2 and was placed on injured reserve on September 21, 2022. He was activated on October 22.

Personal life
Wells is a Christian. He and Morgan, his wife, have one daughter.

References

External links
Tampa Bay Buccaneers bio
James Madison Dukes bio

1991 births
Living people
People from Mechanicsville, Virginia
Players of American football from Virginia
American football offensive tackles
James Madison University alumni
James Madison Dukes football players
Jacksonville Jaguars players
Tampa Bay Buccaneers players